Aleksandra Śląska (4 November 1925 – 18 September 1989) was a Polish film actress. She appeared in 18 films between 1948 and 1983.  Born in Katowice, Upper Silesia, she left for Warsaw after World War II. She was buried in the Powązki Cemetery in Warsaw.

Filmography

 The Last Stage (1948, directed by Wanda Jakubowska) as Superintendent of the Women's Block
 Dom na pustkowiu (1949, directed by Jan Rybkowski) as Basia
 Die Sonnenbrucks (1951, directed by Georg C. Klaren) as Fanchette
 Youth of Chopin (1952, directed by Aleksander Ford) as Konstancja Gladkowska
 Autobus odjezdza 6.20 (1954, directed by Jan Rybkowski) as Krystyna Poradzka
 Five Boys from Barska Street (1954, directed by Aleksander Ford) as Hanka
 Pętla (aka The Noose) (1958, directed by Wojciech Jerzy Has) as Krystyna 
 Rok pierwszy (1960, directed by Witold Lesiewicz) as Dorota
 Historia wspólczesna (1961, directed by Wanda Jakubowska) as Jadwiga Bielas
 Spotkanie w "Bajce" (aka Meeting in the Fable) (1962, directed by Jan Rybkowski) as Teresa
 Ich dzien powszedni (1963, directed by Aleksander Ścibor-Rylski) as Nitka
 Passenger (1963, directed by Andrzej Munk) as Liza
 Mansarda (1963, directed by Konrad Nałęcki) as Maria
 Boleslaw Smialy (1972, directed by Witold Lesiewicz) as Queen
 Królowa Bona (1980-1982, TV Series, directed by Janusz Majewski) as Queen Bona Sforza
 Epitafium dla Barbary Radziwiłłówny (1983, directed by Janusz Majewski) as Queen Bona Sforza d'Aragon

References

External links

1925 births
1989 deaths
20th-century Polish actresses
Actors from Katowice
Burials at Powązki Cemetery
Polish film actresses
Polish stage actresses
Polish television actresses
Recipient of the Meritorious Activist of Culture badge